Rishikesh, also spelt as Hrishikesh, is a city near Dehradun in Dehradun district of the Indian state Uttarakhand. It is situated on the right bank of the Ganges River and is a pilgrimage town for Hindus, with ancient sages and saints meditating here in search of higher knowledge. There are numerous temples and ashrams built along the banks of the river. 

It is known as the "Gateway to the Garhwal Himalayas" and "Yoga Capital of the World". The city has hosted the annual "International Yoga Festival" on the first week of March since 1999. Rishikesh is a vegetarian-only and alcohol-free city.

Rishikesh is the starting point for travelling to the four Chota Char Dham pilgrimage places: Badrinath, Kedarnath, Gangotri, and Yamunotri. It's also a starting point for the Himalayan tourist destinations such as Harsil, Chopta, Auli and famous summer and winter trekking destinations like Dodital, Dayara Bugyal, Kedarkantha, Har Ki Dun for camping and grandeur Himalayan panoramic views.

In September 2015, the Indian Minister of Tourism Mahesh Sharma announced that Rishikesh and Haridwar would be the first "twin national heritage cities".As of 2021, Rishikesh has a total population of 322,825 with the tehsil including the city and its 93 surrounding villages.   

The city is governed by Rishikesh Municipal Corporation and tehsil.

Etymology
IAST: "" is a name derived from Vishnu, composed of hṛṣīka meaning 'senses' and īśa meaning 'lord' for a combined meaning as 'Lord of the Senses'. The name commemorates an apparition of Vishnu to Raibhya Rishi, as a result of his tapasya (austerities), as Lord Hrishikesha. In the Skanda Purana, this area is known as Kubjāmraka, as Lord Vishnu appeared under a mango tree.

History
Rishikesh was part of the legendary "Kedarkhand" mentioned in the Skanda Purana. Legends state that Lord Rama did penance here for killing Ravana, the asura king of Lanka. Lakshmana, Rama's younger brother, crossed the Ganges using two jute ropes at the point where the present Lakshman Jhula suspension bridge stands today. The 248-foot long iron-rope suspension bridge built in 1889 was washed away by flooding in 1924. In 1927, it was replaced by the current, stronger bridge built by the United Provinces Public Works Department, connecting the Tapovan, Tehri and Jonk, Pauri Garhwal districts. Anoted suspension bridge named Ram Jhula was built in 1986 at the nearby Sivananda Nagar. The Skanda Purana also mentions the site as "Indrakund" where Indra underwent a holy bath to remove a curse.

The Gazeteer of Dehradun, written by Indian Civil Service officer HG Walton, describes the site as "beautifully situated on the right bank of the Ganges, on a high cliff overlooking the river. The place is developing very rapidly, especially since the construction of the new bridge over the Song river, the realignment of the pilgrim road from Raiwala to Rishikesh."

The Ganges, one of the most sacred rivers to Hindus, flows through Rishikesh in its course from the Shivalik Hills of the Himalayas to the plains of northern India with temples built along the banks Shatrughna Mandir, Bharat Mandir, and Lakshman Mandir are the ancient temples established by Adi Shankaracharya. Shatrughna Temple is near the Ram Jhula suspension bridge, while Lakshman Mandir is situated near Lakshman Jhula suspension bridge.

The historical records mention that some pilgrims used to stay at Rishikesh, either seeking the site itself or using it as a resting place before moving onwards to the Himalayas. In the transition to a modern tourist town, local markets have evolved from commercializing goods such as local and religious handicrafts to a service-oriented tourist industry with provision stores, cafes, hotels, sites for rafting, and centers for yoga and meditation.

Geography

The town is located in the Tehri Garhwal region of the northern Indian state of Uttarakhand.

After flowing 249 km (155.343 mi) through narrow Himalayan valleys, the Ganges emerges at Rishikesh before debouching onto the Gangetic Plain at the pilgrimage town of Haridwar. Despite the pollution of the Ganges, the water in Rishikesh is relatively unaffected, as the major polluting points are down river in the neighbouring state of Uttar Pradesh.

According to the Köppen-Geiger climate classification system, its climate is humid subtropical (Cwa). The average maximum temperature is 40°C (104°F). The average minimum temperature is 7°C. The wettest month is July with highest rainfall of 444 mm. The driest month is November with rainfall of 10 mm. Months of May, June, July and August has the highest UV index of 12 and January and December have the lowest UV index of 4.

Civic Administration 
The Rishikesh Municipal Corporation has administered the city's 40 wards since the 2018 incorporation of the urban local body. Each ward had between 2,300-3,000 residents during the 2018 assessment. Rishikesh belongs to the Haridwar Lok Sabha constituency. The first and the current mayor of the corporation is Anita Mamgain. The current Municipal Commissioner, commonly known as Nagar Aayukt locally, is Narendra Singh.

Demographics

As per provisional data of 2011 census, Rishikesh had a population of 102,138, out of which males were 54,466 (53%) and females were 47,672 (47%). The literacy rate was 86.86% compared to the national average of 74.04%.

Tourism
In the 2021-2022 fiscal year, Rishikesh had the highest revenue per hotel room among Indian tourist leisure destinations with an average of ₹10,042 per night. The town is one of the favourites of Israeli tourists, who often come here after completing their mandatory IDF service.

Yoga Capital of the World

In February 1968, the Beatles visited Maharishi Mahesh Yogi's ashram in Rishikesh, attracted by his Transcendental Meditation. The Beatles composed numerous songs during their time at the ashram, many of which appear on the band's self-titled double album, also known as the "White Album". Western fans arrived seeking similar experiences, resulting in new yoga and meditation centers that fueled Rishikesh's nickname as the "Yoga Capital of the World". Many of these Westerners have undergone training to become certified yoga gurus.

The city's Sivananda Nagar houses the Sivananda Ashram and Divine Life Society, founded by Swami Sivananda. The Ram Jhula and Lakshman Jhula suspension bridges are accompanied by temples with additional ashrams near Swargashram along the eastern riverbank.

Ganga Aarti at Triveni Ghat 

The Ganga Aarti (also known as Maha Aarthi) is performed at dusk at the Triveni Ghat. This popular Hindu religious ritual involves playing music and providing religious offerings to a fire.

Lakshman Jhula 
In 1939, the British completed construction on a 137m (450ft) long iron suspension bridge on Ganges River at the spot where Lakshman (Rama’s brother) crossed the Ganges on a jute rope.

Rafting 

Rishikesh offers many rafting options along the Ganges from Grades I-IV.

Bungee Jumping 
Rishikesh has India's highest bungee jumping at 83m over a rocky cliff, which has been experienced by over 100,000 tourists.

Flying Fox
The longest flying fox (also known as a zipline) in Asia is in Rishikesh with a length of 1km and speeds of 140km per hour.

Riverside Camps

According to environmental activists, "These camps are not only in violation of Forest (Conservation) Act 1980, but also the Environment (Protection) Act 1986, as well as the Water (Prevention and Control of Pollution) Act 1974, as it is leading to pollution of Ganga by discharging effluent, throwing of solid waste directly and adversely affecting the ecological integrity of the river system."

Environmental activists allege that these camps, which are established as temporary sites, do not have adequate sewage and sanitation facilities, disturb the habitat of wild animals, and "affect the peace, tranquility, and serenity of the forest area. [...] At the campsites, the camp owners permit employees and the visitors to have food and alcohol. They leave empty bottles, cans, unconsumed food and waste including bones and filth in and around the campsite."
In a 2008 study on the beach camps between Kaudiyala and Rishikesh, experts from the Govind Ballabh Pant Himalayan Environment and Development Institute—R. K. Maikhuri, Nihal Farukhi and Tarun Budhal—found that wildlife conservation standards and norms, particularly for waste management, were routinely disregarded.

A bench headed by the National Green Tribunal chairperson Justice Swatanter Kumar on 1 April 2015 heard a plea filed by the non-governmental organisation Social Action for Forest and Environment (SAFE). The National Green Tribunal has sought explanations from the Government of India and the Government of Uttarakhand on the "unregulated" operation of rafting camps on the banks of Ganga between Shivpuri and Rishikesh in Uttarakhand. The state government has assured the tribunal that it would not grant permission to any new camp till the next hearing in May.

As the seriousness of issue "The National Green Tribunal," a bench headed by Justice U. D. Salve has rejected permission to rafting camps operating in Rishikesh and slammed the Ministry of Environment and Forests and the Government of Uttarakhand for not filing their replies in the case and directed them to file their response.

International Yoga Festival (IYF) in March 

The International Yoga Festival has been held every year at the Parmarth Niketan Ashram in Rishikesh since its 1999 founding, bringing tourists each March. The one-week festival involves over 70hrs of yoga lessons.

Healthcare 

AIIMS Rishikesh is one of the six healthcare institutes being established by the Ministry of Health and Family Welfare, Government of India under the Pradhan Mantri Swasthya Suraksha Yojana (PMSSY) with the aim of correcting regional imbalances in quality tertiary level healthcare in the country and attaining self-sufficiency in graduate and postgraduate medical education and training.

The first AYUSH (Ayurveda, Yoga, Unani, Siddha and Homoeopathy) Centre was opened in Rishikesh on 4 June 2015 by Shripad Yasso Naik, the Minister for Yoga and Traditional Medicine, to sponsor new research in these alternative medicine systems.

Transport

Rail 
The Rishikesh and the Yog Nagari Rishikesh railway stations offer service to this city, partially through Indian Railways. A new railway line, connecting Rishikesh with Karnaprayag, is under construction.

Road 
Rishikesh is connected with the state capital, Dehradun, which is 12 km from the city. Private and shared taxi services travel between Rishikesh and most major north Indian cities like Delhi, Chandigarh, and Shimla.

Air 

The nearest Airports are Dehradun Airport (15 km) and New Delhi International Airport (240 km).

Effect on spiritual environment 

The tourism sector has brought tourists illegally importing cannabis and alcohol. Incidents like partial nakedness and drug paraphernalia littered along beaches is producing criticism that Rishikesh is losing its spirituality.

The riverside has spiritual and religious significance because it represents the emergence of the Ganges after the confluence of the Bhagirathi and Alaknanda rivers at Devprayag in the Garhwal Himalayas. Saints and yogis have been meditating on the banks of Ganges since antiquity.

Gallery

See also

 Parmarth Niketan
 Lakshman Jhula
 Ram Jhula
 Muni Ki Reti
 Dhanraj Giri

References

External links

 
Hindu holy cities
Hindu pilgrimage sites in India
Cities and towns in Dehradun district
Tourism in Uttarakhand
Vegetarian towns in India
Religious tourism
Religious tourism in India
Holy cities
Yoga
Rafting
Whitewater sports
Bungee jumping sites
Bungee jumping
Adventure tourism in India
Types of tourism
Yoga as exercise
Yoga as therapy
Yoga training and certification
Ganges